Saint-Savinien is a commune in the Charente-Maritime department in the Nouvelle-Aquitaine region in southwestern France.

Population

History
Saint-Savinien-sur-Charente is one of the most picturesque communes in Roman Saintonge. It dates back to the Roman times.

Sights
Château de la Cave

See also
Communes of the Charente-Maritime department

References

Communes of Charente-Maritime
County of Saintonge